Ali Bendayan nicknamed Aliouat (born 1943) is a Moroccan footballer. He competed in the men's tournament at the 1964 Summer Olympics.

References

External links
 

1943 births
Living people
Moroccan footballers
Morocco international footballers
Olympic footballers of Morocco
Footballers at the 1964 Summer Olympics
Competitors at the 1967 Mediterranean Games
Mediterranean Games competitors for Morocco
Place of birth missing (living people)
Association football forwards
20th-century Moroccan people